The 1920 United States presidential election in Pennsylvania took place on November 2, 1920 as part of the 1920 United States presidential election. Voters chose 38 representatives, or electors to the Electoral College, who voted for president and vice president.

Pennsylvania overwhelmingly voted for the Republican nominee, Senator Warren G. Harding, over the Democratic nominee, Ohio Governor James M. Cox. Harding won Pennsylvania by a landslide margin of 38.56%. This was the first time ever that Berks County voted Republican.

Results

Results by county

See also
 List of United States presidential elections in Pennsylvania

References

Pennsylvania
1920
1920 Pennsylvania elections